Sanguem Sub-District is an administrative region of Goa, India.

Settlements
Many of the Villages mentioned below were ceded to the Dharbandora Sub-Division.

Cities
Sanguem has 1 City: Sanguem City

Towns
Sanguem has 1 Town: Sanvordem

Villages
Sanguem has 45 Villages: Aglote, Bandoli, Bati, Calem, Camarconda, Caranzol, Codli, Colem, Colomba, Comproi, Coranginim, Cormonem, Costi, Cotarli, Cumbari, Curdi, Curpem, Dharbandora, Dongor, Dudal, Maulinguem, Moissal, Molem, Muguli, Naiquinim, Netorli, Nundem, Patiem, Piliem, Porteem, Potrem, Rivona, Rumbrem, Sancordem, Sangod, Santona, Sigao, Sonauli, Surla, Tudou, Uguem, Verlem, Vichundrem, Viliena, Xelpem

References

External links
Cities and villages in Sanguem Taluk
http://www.census2011.co.in/data/subdistrict/5618-sanguem-south-goa-goa.html

Taluks of Goa
Geography of South Goa district